The Wavre radio transmitter is a facility for Fm, Dab+ and TV broadcasting near Wavre in Belgium. Formerly the mediumwave transmissions used a grounded 250-metre-high guyed mast. Furthermore, there was a backup mast for medium wave transmissions, which was 90 metres high. For shortwave broadcasting there were several directional antennas and a curtain antenna.

For the FM/TV/DAB transmission a free-standing lattice tower with a height of 232 metres is used.
This tower whose top is guyed at four horizontal crossbars similar to Grodno TV Tower replaces the mast used for FM/TV transmissions which fell during a storm on 13 October 1983.

See also
 List of masts
 List of towers
 List of famous transmission sites

External links
 
 http://perso.wanadoo.fr/tvignaud/galerie/etranger/be-wavre-fm.htm 
 http://perso.wanadoo.fr/tvignaud/galerie/etranger/be-wavre-am.htm
 http://www.skyscraperpage.com/diagrams/?b39672  
 http://www.skyscraperpage.com/diagrams/?b39673
 https://theantennasite.com/archive/belgium-wavre-chausseedebruxelles-pictures.html

Lattice towers
Radio masts and towers in Europe
Towers in Belgium
Buildings and structures in Walloon Brabant
Wavre